The Musée du Parc M'Ploussoue de Bonoua is a museum located in Ivory Coast. It is located in Bonoua, Comoé District.

References

See also 
 List of museums in Ivory Coast

Museums in Ivory Coast
Buildings and structures in Comoé District
Sud-Comoé